The Knicks–Pacers rivalry is a basketball rivalry between the New York Knicks and the Indiana Pacers of the National Basketball Association (NBA). The rivalry started in 1977 and quickly became one of the most bitter in NBA history. They met in the playoffs 6 times from 1993 to 2000, fueling a rivalry epitomized by the enmity between Pacer Reggie Miller and prominent Knick fan Spike Lee. Miller likened it to the Hatfield–McCoy feud, and The New York Times said in 1998 that it was "as combustible as any in the league".

The rivalry gave Miller the nickname "The Knick-Killer". His clutch performances were frequently followed by jabs at Lee like the choke sign, adding fuel to the rivalry. The rivalry was renewed during the 2013 NBA playoffs in the Eastern Conference Semifinals, with Indiana winning in 6 games.

1993 Eastern Conference first round
The two teams first met in the first round of the 1993 NBA Playoffs. The Knicks, led by Patrick Ewing, Charles Oakley, John Starks, Doc Rivers, and Coach of the Year Pat Riley had amassed a 60–22 record-the best in the East-and earned the top seed in the East. The Pacers, with Miller, Rik Smits, Detlef Schrempf, and Dale Davis barely squeaked into the playoffs with a 41–41 record, thanks to the tiebreaker over the Magic. The Knicks won the first two games at Madison Square Garden before the Pacers won the first of two at Market Square Arena. Game 3 is remembered as being a precursor for the next decade, as trash-talking between Miller and Starks culminated with Starks headbutting Miller in the 3rd quarter, leading to his ejection. The Knicks, however, took Game 4 and advanced to defeat the Hornets before bowing out to the Bulls. (The playoff format had a best-of-5 first round until 2003.) The Pacers fired Bob Hill and hired the nomadic but legendary Larry Brown.

1994 Eastern Conference finals
The Pacers got their first chance at revenge the following year in the 1994 Eastern Conference Finals. Brown traded Schrempf for Derrick McKey and added rookie forward Antonio Davis, veteran Byron Scott, and journeyman point guard Haywoode Workman. They finished with a 47–35 record and the 5th seed in the East, winning their final 8 games. They swept Orlando and upset the top-seeded Hawks in 6.

Meanwhile, the Knicks, following Jordan's first retirement, were heavily favored to win the East. Rivers was lost for the season with a knee injury in December, but New York acquired Derek Harper from Dallas to replace him. Despite winning the Atlantic Division, they lost the top seed in the East to Atlanta; both teams finished 57–25 and split the season series 2–2, but the Hawks won the tiebreaker. The Knicks beat the Nets in 4, then finally beat Chicago in 7 to reach the Eastern Conference Finals, where Indiana was waiting.

Both teams won their first two home games. However, in Game 5 at New York, Miller scored 39 points (25 in the fourth) in the Pacers' 93-86 victory. Miller hit several long 3's during the quarter while engaging in an animated discussion with Spike Lee, who was seated courtside. After Indiana took a 3–2 series lead with the victory, the New York Daily News ran a cover story with Lee's picture and the sarcastic headline, "Thanks A Lot, Spike". However, Indiana lost the next two games and the series. Ewing scored the decisive points off a put-back dunk in Game 7 with 26.9 seconds left. It capped one of the center's finest postseason performances of his career, as he finished with 24 points, 22 rebounds, 7 assists, and 5 blocks. Miller airballed a last-second 3, and the Knicks closed the series out at the foul line for a 94–90 victory.

1995 Eastern Conference semifinals
By virtue of the previous year's 7-game series between the two teams, the Knicks and Pacers were now rivals, but the Pacers had yet to answer their foe's last two playoff series wins. The Pacers addressed their need for a point guard by acquiring former Knick Mark Jackson from the Los Angeles Clippers. Indiana also stepped up their game. Smits enjoyed his best NBA season, averaged career highs of 17.9 points and 7.7 rebounds, Miller continued to lead the team with 19.6 points per game with a .415 3-point percentage (15th in the league) and a .897 free throw percentage (4th in the league) and was a starter in the 1995 NBA All-Star Game and member of the All-NBA Third Team. Derrick McKey played both the third scorer, and provider of intangibles, placing third on the team in both scoring and rebounding, second in assists, and first in steals, earning a spot on the NBA All-Defensive Second Team. Winning the first division title and achieving its first 50-win season since joining the NBA from the ABA with a record of 52–30, the second-seed Pacers swept the Hawks in the first round.

The Knicks, fresh from the previous year's Finals appearance, worked hard to return to the Finals. Anthony Mason, who was eventually named the 1995 NBA Sixth Man of the Year, averaged 9.9 points and 8.4 rebounds, while Ewing (top 10 in scoring, rebounding, and blocks), Starks (15.3 ppg), and others would put up their usually efficient production. Placing 2nd in the Atlantic Division to the Magic with a 55–27 record and the third seed, the Knicks dispatched the Cavs in 4. With the better record, the Knicks had home-court advantage over the Pacers again, setting the stage for another memorable series.

In Game 1 in New York, it was Miller Time again as he amazingly scored 8 points in the final 18.7 seconds: a 3, followed by stealing the inbounds pass and another 3 to tie the game and 2 free throws, erasing the Knicks' 105–99 lead and stealing the game 107–105. The stunned Knicks settled for a 2-game split with a 96–77 victory, but the Pacers won the next 2 in Indiana 97–95 and 98–84 to take a 3–1 series lead. The Knicks won Game 5 in the Garden 96–95 on Ewing's game-winner with 1.8 seconds left to stay alive, and won Game 6 on the road 92–82 to force Game 7. But the Pacers won in New York 97–95, after Ewing missed a potential game-tying layup as time expired. Pat Riley resigned the day after the 1995 NBA Finals ended, and Don Nelson, who had recently stepped down as the Golden State Warriors head coach, became Riley's successor.

1998 Eastern Conference semifinals
After a 3-year hiatus, the two teams renewed the rivalry in the 1998 Eastern Conference Semifinals. Unlike the previous 2 meetings, the Pacers were heavy favorites. The Knicks were without Patrick Ewing, who suffered a severely broken wrist early in the regular season. Ewing returned to the lineup in Game 2, but wasn't 100%. The Knicks managed to make the playoffs as the 7th seed in the East. The Knicks upset the 2nd seeded Heat in 5 in their first round match-up, while the Pacers disposed of the 6th seeded Cavs 3–1.

Indiana won Games 1 and 2 at Market Square Arena. At home in Game 3, the Knicks won 83–76 behind a strong performance by Ewing, who finished with 19 points and 7 rebounds, and a strong defensive effort. Game 4 was a sharp contrast from the first 3 games, as it was a high scoring affair in the Garden that Indiana won 118–107 in OT behind another great performance by Miller, who hit a 3 with 5.1 seconds left to tie it at 102 and force OT. He finished with 38 points. The Pacers also got good performances from Rik Smits (23 points, 8 rebounds), Mark Jackson (16 points, 15 assists), and Chris Mullin (18 points, 5 steals). Indiana clinched the series with a 99–88 win in Game 5 despite a great performance from Knicks guard Allan Houston.

1999 Eastern Conference finals
In the lockout shortened 1998–99 NBA season, the Knicks had a disappointing regular season, despite having a healthy Ewing and the controversial additions of talented guard Latrell Sprewell and Marcus Camby, who were acquired in trades for crowd favorites Starks and Oakley, respectively. However, New York snuck into the playoffs as the eighth seed with a 27–23 record. The Pacers finished as the second seed in the Eastern Conference with a 33–17 record, and were considered by many to be the favorites to win the Eastern Conference with the breakup of the Bulls. The 8th-seeded Knicks were able to knock off 1st seeded Miami for the 2nd year in a row after Allan Houston made the game-winning shot in Game 5 that bounced off the front rim, off the backboard, and in with 0.8 seconds left. This was only the second time in NBA history that a #8 seed beat a #1 seed in the first round. In the Eastern Conference Semifinals, the Knicks stunned the Hawks, sweeping them 4–0. Meanwhile, the Pacers were on a roll in the playoffs, sweeping the Bucks and 76ers.

The Knicks won Game 1 on the road 93–90 behind strong performances from Ewing, Sprewell, Houston, and Larry Johnson. The Pacers settled for a split at Market Square Arena, beating New York 88–86 in Game 2. However, the bigger loss for the Knicks appeared to be the loss of Ewing to an Achilles' tendon injury. He was out for the rest of the playoffs. However, with the series heading back to New York, the Knicks played inspired basketball. New York won Game 3 92–91 behind strong performances from Johnson (26 points, 8 rebounds) and Camby (21 points, 11 rebounds, and 4 steals). It was Johnson's 4-point play, on a controversial foul call on Antonio Davis, that ended up as the game-winner. The Pacers shook off the loss to win Game 4 at Madison Square Garden 90–78 to even the series back up at 2. With the series going back to Indiana for Game 5 without Ewing, New York's Cinderella run appeared to be over. But the Knicks played inspired in Game 5, and won 101–94 at Market Square Arena despite a 30-point performance from Miller, to take a 3–2 lead with a chance to clinch in New York. New York was anchored by strong performances from Sprewell (29 points) and Camby (21 points, 13 rebounds, and 6 blocks). The Knicks suffered yet another blow in Game 6, with Larry Johnson going down with an injury early in the first half. But Allan Houston's 32 points, coupled with one of the worst postseason performances of Miller's career (He scored only 8 points on 3-of-18 shooting), helped New York beat Indiana 90–82 to clinch the series 4–2. With their victory, the Knicks became the first eighth seed to reach the NBA Finals before falling short against the San Antonio Spurs in 5 games. As of today, they remain the only #8 seed to do so.

2000 Eastern Conference finals
The Pacers finished the regular season 56–26 and clinched the top seed in the Eastern Conference. The Pacers were pushed to the limit in the first round by the Bucks, led by Ray Allen. In the decisive Game 5, Reggie Miller tied his career playoff high by scoring 41 points to win the series. After beating Allen Iverson's 76ers in the second round by 6 games, the Pacers once again reached the Eastern Conference Finals.

The Knicks, the third seed in the Eastern Conference playoffs, swept the Raptors in 3. The Knicks were once again matched up against Miami, and won the series in 7.

The Pacers, having home court advantage throughout the Eastern Conference Playoffs, won the first two games against the Knicks in their first year at the newly constructed Conseco Fieldhouse, now named Gainbridge Fieldhouse. Returning to New York, the Knicks evened up the series at 2 by winning the following 2 at the Garden. The Pacers won the next game at home, and then Game 6 (in what would be Ewing's last game as a Knick) in New York 93–80 behind Reggie Miller's game-high 34 points, (5–7 from downtown). Reggie scored 17 in the fourth (3–3 from downtown) as the Pacers advanced to the NBA Finals for the first (and so far, only) time in franchise history. The Pacers would eventually lose to the Los Angeles Lakers in 6 games led by superstars Kobe Bryant and Shaquille O'Neal.

2013 Eastern Conference semifinals
The Knicks had major struggles after the Ewing era. They did not win a single playoff series from 2001 to 2012. Meanwhile, the Pacers remained competitive even as Reggie Miller neared retirement, but struggled after he retired, making the playoffs only once between 2005–10.

The Knicks and Pacers rebuilt their teams and returned to the playoffs in 2011. The Knicks were now led by high-scoring Carmelo Anthony, while the Pacers, led by Paul George, David West and Roy Hibbert, relied on their trademark defense-first philosophy in returning to the playoffs. It took some time before both teams regained the elite status they enjoyed in the 1990s.

On May 3, 2013, the Knicks beat the Celtics on the road and won the first round series 4-2 while Pacers beat the Hawks on the road to win their series 4-2. The Pacers took Game 1 in New York 102–95, but the Knicks regrouped themselves in Game 2 and blew out Indiana 105–79. In Game 3, Amar'e Stoudemire returned from knee surgery but couldn't help the Knicks as they lost 82–71. The Pacers won Game 4 in Indianapolis 93–82 to take a 3–1 series lead, but New York took Game 5 85–75 to stay alive. In Game 6, the Pacers went on an 11–3 run late to take the lead for good and win 106–99 to eliminate New York and advance to the Eastern Conference Finals, losing to the eventual NBA champions Miami Heat in 7.

Aftermath
The Knicks reached the NBA Finals in 1994 and 1999 (after Michael Jordan's first and second retirements, respectively), but lost in 1994 to the Rockets in 7 games, though they were up 3–2 in the series, and in 1999 in an uneventful 5 to the Spurs. The defeat in 1994 denied New York the distinction of having both NBA and NHL championships in the same year, as Madison Square Garden hosted the New York Rangers first Stanley Cup celebration in 54 years following their win over the Canucks in Game 7 of the 1994 Stanley Cup Finals while the series was in New York. (The Rockets had home court advantage during the 1994 Finals.)

The Pacers finally reached the NBA Finals by defeating the Knicks in the 2000 Eastern Conference Finals, eventually losing to the Lakers in 6 games. The playoff battles between these two franchises led to some of the greatest moments in NBA playoff history, such as Larry Johnson's 4-point play in the waning seconds of Game 3 of the 1999 Eastern Conference Finals, Miller's 25 4th quarter points in Game 5 of the 1994 Eastern Conference Finals, and Miller's 8 points in the last 18.7 seconds to win Game 1 of the 1995 Eastern Conference Semifinals.

Despite the animosity between the 2 teams, Miller was featured in a cameo in the 1998 film He Got Game, directed by Spike Lee. During Miller's final game at Madison Square Garden, the crowd began to chant Miller's name, and Miller and Lee embraced at the game's end.

Results (1976–77 season–present)

References
 Winning Time: Reggie Miller v. the New York Knicks

National Basketball Association rivalries
Indiana Pacers
New York Knicks